Kirkwall Grammar School is a secondary school in Kirkwall, Orkney, Scotland. The current school building was opened in 2014.

History
Kirkwall Grammar School was established in 1200 when Bishop Bjarni established a cathedral school where his clergy taught singing and Latin.

In 1760, £60 was donated in order to repair and build two schools. These plans resulted in two new schools being built north of St Magnus Cathedral.

A new Kirkwall Grammar School building opened in 1973, and pupils were accommodated into the new building in groups over time, eventually all being housed in the building by summer 1975. This school building housed the city’s swimming pool. It was demolished in stages starting in Autumn 2011, and in December 2013 the building shut its doors to pupils. The rest of the building was demolished in January 2014, and the site it sat on became the playing fields for the new building.

The new Kirkwall Grammar School building opened for pupils at the start of the new term in January 2014, but was officially opened in June 2014 by Alex Salmond.

Intake
Kirkwall Grammar School accepts pupils from Papdale Primary School, Glaitness Primary School, St Andrews Primary School, Burray Primary School, Hope Community School, Orphir Community School, Shapinsay Community School, Rousay Community School, Flotta Community School, Eday Community School, North Ronaldsay Primary School and Egilsay Community School.
The school also takes in pupils from North Walls Junior High School once they reach S3, and Sanday, Westray and Stronsay Junior High Schools when they reach S5 or S6.

Pupils from the primary schools in the KGS catchment area attend the school for two transition days in June before the summer holidays where they are assigned their classes and timetable and given a taster of the school. After the summer holidays they attend the school full time.

Houses
The houses in Kirkwall Grammar School are:

Copinsay (Yellow)
Eynhallow (Red)
Fara (Blue)

The houses are named after uninhabited Orkney islands, and were chosen via a school vote in April 2016. They were adopted in August 2016, at the start of the new term.

The new houses came into effect after the summer holidays of 2016, replacing the six original houses.
The old KGS houses were named after Orkney beaches; Berstane, Dingieshowe, Inganess, Newark, Scapa and Waulkmill.

Notable former pupils

 James Aitken, (1613-1687), Church of Scotland bishop
 Sir James David Marwick, (1826-1908), lawyer, historian and town clerk
 William Peddie, (1861-1946), physicist and applied mathematician
 Stanley Cursiter, (1887-1976), artist
 Robert Rendall, (1898-1967), poet
 Alexander Burt Taylor, (1904-1972), civil servant
 Peter Marshall, (1964- ), historian of the Reformation
 Liam McArthur, (1967- ), Member of the Scottish Parliament for Orkney
 Neil Gray, (1986- ), Member of the Scottish Parliament for Airdrie and Shotts

See also
Education in Scotland

References

External links
 

Secondary schools in Scotland
Education in Orkney
Kirkwall